Tiku (also Romanized as Tīkū; also known as Tīkūh) is a village in Fin Rural District, Fin District, Bandar Abbas County, Hormozgan Province, Iran. At the 2006 census, its population was 40, in 7 families.

References 

Populated places in Bandar Abbas County